Ziridava rubridisca is a moth in the family Geometridae. It is found in southern India and Sri Lanka.

References

Moths described in 1891
Eupitheciini